The 2012 NBA Development League Draft was the 12th draft of the National Basketball Association Development League (NBDL). The draft was held on November 2, 2012 before the 2012–13 season. In this draft, all 16 of the league's teams took turns selecting eligible players.

JaJuan Johnson was the first overall draft pick. In 2011–12 he had played for the Boston Celtics after being selected in the 2011 NBA draft. He became the second "Johnson" taken number one overall in the NBDL's after Ken Johnson was chosen in 2003. The first non-American selected was Christian Eyenga, who was taken eighth by the Texas Legends. Ten players had also been selected previously in an NBA draft – JaJuan Johnson, Andrew Goudelock, Justin Harper, Shelvin Mack, Shan Foster, Christian Eyenga, Jack McClinton, Travis Leslie, DeVon Hardin, and Sean Singletary.

Although some of the players chosen in the 2012 NBA Development League Draft had played semi-professional and/or professional basketball after college graduation, only the United States colleges they attended are listed.

Key

Draft

References
General

Specific

Draft
NBA G League draft
National Basketball Association lists
NBA Development League draft